Cione is a surname. Notable people with the surname include:

Jacopo di Cione (1325–1390), Italian painter
Jean Cione [Cy] (1928–2010), pitcher who played from 1945 through 1954 in the All-American Girls Professional Baseball League
Matteo di Cione (1330–1380), Italian sculptor, brother of three painters of Gothic Florence, Nardo di Cione, Jacopo di Cione and Andrea di Cione
Nardo di Cione, (active 1343 – c. 1365), Italian painter, sculptor and architect from Florence